Nils Ahrén (30 December 1877 – 1 April 1928) was a Swedish silent film actor. He appeared in 27 films between 1913 and 1928.

Selected filmography
 The Conflicts of Life (1913)
 Judge Not (1914)
 The Outlaw and His Wife (1918)
 His Lordship's Last Will (1919)
 Karin Daughter of Ingmar (1920)
 The Phantom Carriage (1921)
 Thomas Graal's Ward (1922)
 The Lady of the Camellias (1925)
 Ingmar's Inheritance (1925)
 Kalle Utter (1925)
 Only a Dancing Girl (1926)
 To the Orient (1926)
 The Girl in Tails (1926)
 The Devil and the Smalander (1927)
 Troll-elgen (1927)

References

External links

1877 births
1928 deaths
People from Sundsvall
Swedish male film actors
Swedish male silent film actors
20th-century Swedish male actors